Dichocrocis megillalis is a moth in the family Crambidae. It was described by Francis Walker in 1859. It is found in the Khasi Hills of India and on the island of Borneo.

References

Moths described in 1859
Spilomelinae